Bathroom Divas: So You Want to Be an Opera Star? is a television show that originally aired on Bravo! Canada for two seasons. It was produced by Kaleidoscope Entertainment, Inc. and directed by Mike Ward. The winner got to perform live in front of a world class orchestra. The title is a hint to the expression "bathroom singing".

It was picked up by Ovation TV to replay the previous episodes.

Seasons

Season 1
Judges: The principal judges were Mary Lou Fallis, Tom Diamond, Gary Relyea, and Michael McMahon. 
Winner: Elton Lammie

Season 2
Judges: Mary Lou Fallis and Tom Diamond are joined by Liz Upchurch and Daniel Lichti.
Winner: Elaine Jean Brown

External links
Official site
Here's a switch -- reality TV with class
 Once shy singer tries her luck on Bravo TV
London soprano reality show's second-best Bathroom Diva
Season Two Press Release

CTV Drama Channel original programming
Singing talent shows
Canadian reality television series
Canadian music television series